Point Beach State Forest is a  Wisconsin state forest near Two Rivers, Wisconsin in Manitowoc County. The forest is located along  of the Lake Michigan coast. Point Beach State Forest was established in 1938. The Point Beach Ridges, a National Natural Landmark, are located within the forest.

References

External links
Point Beach State Forest website

Wisconsin state forests
Protected areas of Manitowoc County, Wisconsin
Protected areas established in 1938
Nature centers in Wisconsin
1938 establishments in Wisconsin